was a Japanese mathematician who made fundamental contributions to probability theory, in particular, the theory of stochastic processes. He invented the concept of stochastic integral and stochastic differential equation, and is known as the founder of so-called Itô calculus.

Overview 

Itô pioneered the theory of stochastic integration and stochastic differential equations, now known as Itô calculus. Its basic concept is the Itô integral, and among the most important results is a change of variable formula known as Itô's lemma. Itô calculus is a method used in the mathematical study of random events and is applied in various fields, and is perhaps best known for its use in mathematical finance. Itô also made contributions to the study of diffusion processes on manifolds, known as stochastic differential geometry.

Although the standard Hepburn romanization of his name is Kiyoshi Itō, he used the spelling Kiyosi Itô (Kunrei-shiki romanization). The alternative spellings Itoh and Ito are also sometimes seen in the West.

Biography

Itô was born in Hokusei-cho in Mie Prefecture on the main island of Honshū. He graduated with a B.S. (1938) and a Ph.D (1945) in Mathematics from the University of Tokyo. Between 1938 and 1945, Itô worked for the Japanese National Statistical Bureau, where he published two of his seminal works on probability and stochastic processes, including a series of articles in which he defined the stochastic integral and laid the foundations of the Itō calculus. After that he continued to develop his ideas on stochastic analysis with many important papers on the topic.

In 1952, he became a Professor at the University of Kyoto to which he remained affiliated until his retirement in 1979. Starting in the 1950s, Itô spent long periods of time outside Japan, at Cornell, Stanford, the Institute for Advanced Study in Princeton, New Jersey, and Aarhus University in Denmark.

Itô was awarded the inaugural Gauss Prize in 2006 by the International Mathematical Union for his lifetime achievements. As he was unable to travel to Madrid, his youngest daughter, Junko Itô received the Gauss Prize from the King of Spain on his behalf. Later, International Mathematics Union (IMU) President Sir John Ball personally presented the medal to Itô at a special ceremony held in Kyoto.

In October 2008, Itô was honored with Japan's Order of Culture, and an awards ceremony for the Order of Culture was held at the Imperial Palace.

Itô wrote in Japanese, Chinese, German, French and English.

He died on November 10, 2008 in Kyoto, Japan at age 93.

Scientific works of Kiyosi Itô

Notes

References

Obituary at The New York Times

See also
Itô calculus
Itô diffusion
Itô integral
Itô isometry
Itô's lemma
Black–Scholes model

External links
 Kiyosi Itô(1915-2008) / Eightieth Birthday Lecture RIMS, Kyoto University, September 1995 / Research Institute for Mathematical Sciences, Kyoto University Kyoto
 Bibliography of Kiyosi Itô
 Kiyosi Itô at Research Institute for Mathematical Sciences
 
 Kiyoshi Ito Japanese mathematician / Encyclopedia Britannica

1915 births
2008 deaths
People from Mie Prefecture
20th-century Japanese mathematicians
21st-century Japanese mathematicians
Kyoto laureates in Basic Sciences
Foreign associates of the National Academy of Sciences
Probability theorists
Wolf Prize in Mathematics laureates
University of Tokyo alumni
Academic staff of Kyoto University
Cornell University faculty
Members of the French Academy of Sciences
Institute for Advanced Study visiting scholars
Recipients of the Order of Culture
Laureates of the Imperial Prize
Cornell University people